Sepp Weiler (22 January 1921, Oberstdorf, Bavaria – 24 May 1997) was a West German ski jumper who competed from 1952 to 1956.

Career
He finished tied for eighth in the individual large hill event at the 1952 Winter Olympics in Oslo. Weiler's best career finish was fifth in an individual normal hill event in Austria in 1953.

On 2-3 March 1950 he set two world records at 127 metres (417 ft) on Heini-Klopfer-Skiflugschanze ski flying hill in Oberstdorf, West Germany.

Ski jumping world records

*Weiler jumped 133 metres after Dan Netzell set world record (Ljudska pravica; 4/3/1950).

Notes

References

External links

1921 births
1997 deaths
People from Oberstdorf
Sportspeople from Swabia (Bavaria)
Olympic ski jumpers of West Germany
Ski jumpers at the 1952 Winter Olympics
German male ski jumpers